The Co-Cathedral of St. Thomas More is a Catholic cathedral located in Tallahassee, Florida, United States.  Along with the Cathedral of the Sacred Heart in Pensacola it is the seat of the Diocese of Pensacola-Tallahassee.  St. Thomas More also provides the Catholic Campus Ministry at Florida State University.

The Altar Relics of the Co-Cathedral are of Saint Felix and Saint Felicity.

History

Newman Club and early Student Center
The present day parish traces its origin to the 1930s with the Newman Club of the Florida State College for Women that met in the home of Dr. Paul Coughlin. This  Catholic student organization would continue after the Florida State College for Women was converted into the current Florida State University (FSU) in 1947; becoming a chapter to the newly formed university. Three years after the formation of FSU, the club acquired the home of Dr. Conradi, located on the corner of Park Avenue and Macomb Street, just to the east of FSU grounds. This home became the first permanent student center for the Newman Club, complete with a live-in house-mother to make the center accessible.

Current Grounds
Archbishop Joseph Hurley of St. Augustine (which had jurisdiction over Tallahassee at the time), sought to build a more prominent and official student center-chapel on a hill overlooking the university. Picking the present location, the diocese began purchasing the land plot by plot with the assistance of the Highland Reality Company of Miami and Jesse Warren Esquire. In 1963 preliminary plans for the new Student Center were sent to pastor Patrick Madden of the local parish of the Blessed Sacrament. Ground breaking of the construction took place two years later on December 4, 1965. The chapel was officially dedicated by Bishop Hurley on October 8, 1967.

The chapel status would be short lived, as in 1968, the new Bishop of St. Augustine, Paul Tanner, would elevate it to the status of a student parish, where it would stay for seven years. On October 7, 1975, six days after the formation of the Diocese of Pensacola-Tallahassee, the parish was made the  Co-Cathedral of St. Thomas More.

See also
List of Catholic cathedrals in the United States
List of cathedrals in Florida

References

External links

Official Cathedral Site
Roman Catholic Diocese of Pensacola–Tallahassee Official Site
Catholic Student Union

Christian organizations established in 1968
Roman Catholic Diocese of Pensacola–Tallahassee
Thomas More, St., Tallahassee
Roman Catholic churches in Florida
Churches in Tallahassee, Florida
1968 establishments in Florida